The 2017–18 Lietuvos krepšinio lyga, also called Betsafe-LKL for sponsorship reasons, was the 25th season of the top-tier level professional basketball league of Lithuania, the Lietuvos krepšinio lyga (LKL). The season started in September 2017, and the last game of final series was played in 18 June 2018.

Žalgiris is the defending champion.

Competition format 
During the regular season, all teams will play 36 games. The top eight teams in the regular season standings, after playing their entire 36 game schedule, will each qualify for the playoffs in the quarterfinals, that will be played in a best-of-five games format. The semifinals will also be played in that format.

The final round will be played between the two winners of the semifinals. The finals series, for first place, will be played in a best-of-seven format, while the series for third place will be played in a best-of-five format.

Teams

Regular season
In the regular season, teams play against each other four times, home-and-away, in double a round-robin format. The eight first qualified teams advance to the play-offs. The regular season started on 19 September 2017.

Table

Play-offs

The quarter-finals are played in a best-of-five format, with the higher seeded team playing the first, third and (if necessary) fifth game at home. The semi-finals are played in a best-of-five format and the finals in a best-of-seven format, with the higher seed team playing games 1, 3, 5 and 7 (if necessary) at home.

Bracket

Quarterfinals

|}

Semifinals

|}

Third place series

|}

Finals

|}

Attendance data
Attendance data included playoff games:

Clubs in European competitions

Clubs in regional competitions

References

External links
 LKL website

 
Lietuvos krepšinio lyga seasons
Lithuanian
LKL